James Philip Bankoff (born December 23, 1969) is an American businessman who is the co-founder, chairman, and chief executive officer (CEO) of Vox Media. He previously worked for AOL and joined Vox Media's predecessor, SB Nation, in 2009.

Early life and education 
James Philip Bankoff was born to Marvin and Adrienne Bankoff on December 23, 1969, and raised in Upper Saddle River, New Jersey. His father owned a jewelry business and his mother worked as an editor. Bankoff developed an interest in media at an early age. He obtained a bachelor's degree in international studies from Emory University. During his senior year, he interned at CNN. Bankoff earned his Master of Business Administration degree at the Wharton School of the University of Pennsylvania.

Career

Early career and AOL 
Bankoff initially worked as a production assistant for the WETA-TV series Washington Week. He also worked at Ruder Finn's Global Public Affairs group, where he became an account supervisor in 1991. After graduating from Wharton, he declined job offers from The New York Times, The Walt Disney Company, and a record company to join AOL in 1995. In various roles, he worked on projects including AIM, AOL.com, AOL Music, FanHouse, MapQuest, Moviefone, and Netscape. He focused on the company's digital content business, helped the company acquire Engadget, and was involved in the creation of TMZ.

Bankoff became director of business development for AOL Greenhouse in 1996. He was named vice-president of strategy and operations for the AOL brand in 1998, and oversaw business strategy, category management, and content acquisition. He also directed AOL Music and AOL Plus. Following the merger of AOL and Netscape, Bankoff became president of Netscape in 2001. He was responsible for business operations and the growth of Netscape.com and Netbusiness. He then served as president of AOL Web Properties, managing AIM, CompuServe, ICQ, MapQuest, Moviefone, and Netscape.

Bankoff held the role of executive vice-president of programming and products from 2002. Bankoff left AOL in late 2006, working as a consultant for The Huffington Post and SB Nation, starting in 2008.

SB Nation and Vox Media 

As an angel investor for SB Nation, Bankoff led the company's first round of financing. He became its chairman and chief executive officer (CEO) in January 2009. He expanded SB Nations network and number of writers. In November 2011, Bankoff co-founded Vox Media as the parent company for SB Nation and The Verge. As Vox Media's chairman and CEO, Bankoff pursued growing the company through acquisitions. He oversees the company's media brands.

Accolades 
In 2015, Bankoff was included in Washingtonian list of the "100 Top Tech Leaders" in Washington, D.C., and ranked number 18 on Business Insider "Silicon Alley 100" list of the "coolest, most inspiring people in the New York tech industry". He was also included in The Hollywood Reporter list of "The 35 Most Powerful People in New York Media" in 2016. Bankoff ranked number 67 on Mediaite's list of the most influential figures in media in 2017.

Personal life 
Bankoff and Diane Elson, who founded the rug design company Elson&Company in 1998, married on April 26, 2003. Bankoff is a fan of the New York Yankees.

References

External links 
 

Place of birth missing (living people)
Living people
American chief executives
AOL people
Businesspeople from New Jersey
Emmy Award winners
Emory University alumni
People from Upper Saddle River, New Jersey
Wharton School of the University of Pennsylvania alumni
1969 births